is a Japanese windsurfer, who specialized in Neil Pryde RS:X class. As of September 2013, Sunaga is ranked no. 53 in the world for the sailboard class by the International Sailing Federation.

Sunaga competed in the women's RS:X class at the 2012 Summer Olympics in London by finishing thirty-third and receiving a berth from the ISAF World Championships in Perth, Western Australia. Struggling to attain a top position in the opening series, Sunaga accumulated a net score of 180 points for a twenty-first-place finish in a fleet of twenty-six windsurfers.

References

External links
 
 
 
 

1980 births
Living people
Japanese female sailors (sport)
Olympic sailors of Japan
Sailors at the 2012 Summer Olympics – RS:X
Sailors at the 2020 Summer Olympics – RS:X
Sportspeople from Saitama Prefecture
Japanese windsurfers
Female windsurfers